Virginia Felicia Auber (1825–1897) was a Spanish author who lived for many years in Cuba.

Life 
Virginia was born in Coruña, Spain, in 1825. She went to Cuba in 1833 and resided there until 1873, when she returned to Europe. 

She wrote much under the pen name "Felicia", and published several novels, including: 

 Perseverancia, 
 Otros tiempos, 
 Un amor misterioso, 
 Una habanera.

She died in Madrid on 20 March 1897.

Notes

References 
 Ossorio y Bernard, Manuel (1903). «Auber (Virginia Felicia)». Ensayo de un catálogo de periodistas españoles del siglo XIX. Madrid: J. Palacios. p. 28.
 Wilson, J. G.; Fiske, J., eds. (1888). "Auber, Virginia Felicia". Appletons' Cyclopædia of American Biography. Vol. 1. New York: D. Appleton. p. 116. 

1825 births
1897 deaths
19th-century Spanish writers
19th-century Spanish women writers
People from A Coruña